Višeslav is a Serbo-Croatian masculine given name, a Slavic dithematic name (of two lexemes), derived from the Slavic words više ("higher") and -slav ("glory, fame"), roughly meaning "higher glory". It may refer to:

Višeslav of Serbia, Prince of Serbia ( 780)
Višeslav of Croatia, Prince of Dalmatian Croatia ( 800–10)
Višeslav Sarić, Croatian water polo player (born 1977)

See also
Vojislav

Slavic masculine given names
Serbian masculine given names